The King Alfred School is a co-educational independent day school in Golders Green in North West London. It was founded in London in 1898 by Charles E. Rice, a former teacher at Bedales School . The school was considered “radical” for its era, as it provided a secular education in a co-educational setting.

Notable former pupils

 Ian Aitken, journalist and political commentator
 Pegaret Anthony, artist and lecturer
 Nora Beloff, journalist
 Richard Clements, journalist and political adviser
 Nina Conti, actress, ventriloquist and comedian
 A.G. Cook (real name Alex Cook), musician and founder of the web label PC Music
 Richard Gregory, experimental psychologist
 J. B. Gunn, physicist
 Fergus Henderson, restaurateur and founder of St John restaurants in London
 Dylan Howe, musician and composer
 Lucy Jones, artist
 Alexis Korner, pop musician
 Paul Kossoff, pop musician
 Harold Scott MacDonald Coxeter, geometer
 Danny Kustow, pop musician 
 Chloe Madeley, television host, journalist and ice skater
 Juliet Mitchell, psychologist
 Heydon Prowse, actor and activist
 Gaby Roslin, TV personality
 Jolyon Rubinstein, actor and activist
 Raphael Samuel, historian
 Peggy van Praagh, ballet dancer, teacher and director
 Zoë Wanamaker, actor 
 Bonnie Wright, actress
 Emily Young, sculptor

References

Bibliography 

 

1898 establishments in England
Educational institutions established in 1898
Private co-educational schools in London
Private schools in the London Borough of Barnet